is a town located in Hidaka District, Wakayama Prefecture, Japan. , the town had an estimated population of 6,761 in 3083 households and a population density of 530 persons per km².

Geography 
Mihama is located on the coast  in central Wakayama Prefecture, facing the Kii Channel to the southwest. The eastern part of the town is part of the Hidaka Plain and is the center of the city. The western part is designated as Enjukaigan Prefectural Natural Park. The highest point is Mount Nishiyama, with an elevation of 329 meters.

Neighboring municipalities
Wakayama Prefecture
Gobō
Hidaka

Climate
Mihama has a Humid subtropical climate (Köppen Cfa) characterized by warm summers and cool winters with light to no snowfall.  The average annual temperature in Mihama is 16.8 °C. The average annual rainfall is 1878 mm with September as the wettest month. The temperatures are highest on average in August, at around 26.7 °C, and lowest in January, at around 7.3 °C. The area is subject to typhoons in summer.

Demographics
Per Japanese census data, the population of Mihama has remained fairly steady over the past 70 years.

History
The area of the modern town of Inami was within ancient Kii Province. The villages of Matsubara, Mio and Wada were established with the creation of the modern municipalities system on April 1, 1889. These three villages merged on October 1, 1954 to form the town of Mihama.

Government
Mihama has a mayor-council form of government with a directly elected mayor and a unicameral city council of 10 members. Inami collectively with the other municipalities of Hidaka District, contributes three members to the Wakayama Prefectural Assembly. In terms of national politics, the town is part of Wakayama 3rd district of the lower house of the Diet of Japan.

Economy
The economy of Mihama is centered on commercial fishing and agriculture. The main catch is (Shirasu, spiny lobster, and abalone). The main crops are rice and cucumbers.

Education
Mihama has two public elementary schools and one public middle schools operated by the town government. The town does not have a high school.

Transportation

Railway 
Mihama has no passenger rail service. The nearest train station is Gobō Station on the JR West Kisei Main Line in the neighboring city of Gobō

Highways 
Mihama is not on any national highway or expressway.

Local attractions
Hinomisaki Lighthouse

References

External links

Mihama official website 

Towns in Wakayama Prefecture
Mihama, Wakayama
Populated coastal places in Japan